Westport Airport  is a town-owned, public-use airport located two nautical miles (4 km) east of the central business district of Westport, a town in Pawnee County, Oklahoma, United States.

Facilities and aircraft 
Westport Airport covers an area of 13 acres (5 ha) at an elevation of 901 feet (275 m) above mean sea level. It has one runway designated 3/21 with an asphalt surface measuring 2,900 by 42 feet (884 x 13 m).

For the 12-month period ending April 18, 2006, the airport had 4,800 general aviation aircraft operations, an average of 13 per day. At that time there were 18 aircraft based at this airport: 12 single-engine, 4 helicopter, and 2 multi-engine.

References

External links 
 Westport Airport (4F1) at Oklahoma Aeronautics Commission Airport Directory.
 Aerial image as of March 1995 from USGS The National Map
 

Airports in Oklahoma
Transportation in Pawnee County, Oklahoma